Filip Stanković may refer to:
Filip Stanković (footballer, born 1997), Serbian football defender
Filip Stanković (footballer, born 2002), Serbian football goalkeeper